The 1947 Washington and Lee Generals football team was an American football team that represented Washington and Lee University as a member of the Southern Conference during the 1947 college football season. In its second season under head coach Art Lewis, the team compiled a 5–3 record (3–2 against conference opponents), finished in fifth place in the conference, and was outscored by a total of 226 to 140.

Schedule

References

Washington and Lee
Washington and Lee Generals football seasons
Washington and Lee Generals football